The Kiwanis Music Festival movement consists of regional music competitions.
These festivals are named after the Kiwanis service clubs which generally support the events in each community. Typically, musicians and speech arts performers at each festival are given the opportunity to perform and compete for scholarships.

Festivals by city

Festival participants
 Lara St. John, a London, Ontario-based Kiwanis Festival Winner.

References

External links
 
  

Canadian music awards
Music competitions in Canada
Kiwanis
Classical music festivals in Canada